LaRena LeBarr Clark (1904-1991) was a Canadian traditional singer and folksinger.

Early years 
Clark was born near Pefferlaw, Ontario, Canada in 1904 near Lake Simcoe. Her father and grandfather were hunters and guides. Her mother Mary Frances Watson was also a singer. She frequently identified herself as a "ninth generation Canadian."

Career 
Clark became involved in the folk music circuit in Canada and the United States in the 1960s and recorded an album in 1968. She performed at the Mariposa Folk Festival in 1965 and 1965. She also performed at the Madoc Music Festival, the Philadelphia Folk Festival, and others in Canada and the United States in the late 1960s. In 1967 she and her husband built a model Canadian pioneer farmstead and toured it around the province as part of Canada's centennial celebrations in 1967. In the late 1970s she set out to record 25 albums of traditional Canadian folk and popular songs, working with a local radio station CHAY-FM, as well as recording half hour television programming in Owen Sound.

Personal life 
Clark was married three times and during her first two marriages she bore six children. During World War II she worked as a cook in a mess hall for the Canadian Armed Forces at Camp Bordon.  While working there, she met Gordon Clark, a veteran, and the two married in 1947. The couple were living in Ottawa in 1961 when she met folklorist Edith Fowke, who collected and recorded her songs.

She died in 1991.

Awards
 1987: Marius Barbeau Medal, Folklore Studies Association of Canada

Select recordings

Additional resources
 Fowke, Edith and Jay Rahn. A Family Heritage: The Story and Song of LaRena Clark. Calgary: University of Calgary Press, 1994.

References

External links 

 Entry in Canadian Encyclopedia

1904 births
1991 deaths
Canadian folklorists
Women folklorists
Canadian folk singers
Canadian women folk singers
Topic Records artists